

tr

tra

trab-tram
trabectedin (USAN)
trabedersen (USAN)
traboxopine (INN)
tracazolate (INN)
Tracleer (Actelion)
Tracrium 
tradecamide (INN)
trafermin (INN)
Trajenta (Eli Lilly/Boehringer)
Tral 
tralokinumab (INN)
tralonide (INN)
tramadol (INN)
tramazoline (INN)
trametinib (USAN, INN)
tramiprosate (USAN)

tran-trav
Trancopal 
Trandate 
trandolapril (INN)
trandolaprilat (INN)
tranexamic acid (INN)
tranilast (INN)
Tranmep 
Trans-Ver-Sal
transcainide (INN)
Transderm scop 
Transderm-Nitro 
transferrin aldifitox (USAN)
trantelinium bromide (INN)
Tranxene 
tranylcypromine (INN)
trapencaine (INN)
trapidil (INN)
Trasicor 
trastuzumab emtansine (INN)
trastuzumab (INN)
Trasylol 
Travamulsion 
Travase 
Travasol 
Travatan 
Travert
travoprost (INN)

trax-traz
traxanox (INN)
trazitiline (INN)
trazium esilate (INN)
trazodone (INN)
trazolopride (INN)

tre

treb-tres
trebananib (USAN)
trebenzomine (INN)
trecadrine (INN)
Trecator-Sc 
trecovirsen (INN)
trefentanil (INN)
tregalizumab (INN)
trelagliptin (USAN)
trelanserin (USAN)
trelnarizine (INN)
treloxinate (INN)
Trelstar 
tremacamra (INN)
tremelimumab (USAN)
Tremin 
trenbolone (INN)
Trendar
trengestone (INN)
trenizine (INN)
Trental (Sanofi-Aventis) redirects to pentoxifylline 
treosulfan (INN)
trepibutone (INN)
trepipam (INN)
trepirium iodide (INN)
treprostinil (USAN)
treptilamine (INN)
trequinsin (INN)
tresperimus (INN)
Trest. Redirects to Metixene.
trestolone (INN)

tret-trex
tretamine (INN)
tretazicar (INN, USAN)
trethinium tosilate (INN)
trethocanic acid (INN)
tretinoin tocoferil (INN)
tretinoin (INN)
tretoquinol (INN)
Trexall

tri
Tri-Chlor
Tri-Immunol
Tri-K
Tri-Levlen
Tri-Luma 
Tri-Nasal 
Tri-Norinyl 
Tri-Phen-Chlor
Tri-Previfem 
Tri-Pseudo
Tri-Sprintec 
Tri-Sudo
Tri-Tannate
Tri-Vi-Flor
Tri-Vi-Sol

tria-trib
Triacet 
triacetin (INN)
Triacin-C 
Triacort 
Triad 
Triaderm
triafungin (INN)
Trialodine 
triamcinolone benetonide (INN)
triamcinolone furetonide (INN)
triamcinolone hexacetonide (INN)
triamcinolone (INN)
Triaminic-12 
triampyzine (INN)
triamterene (INN)
Trianal
Triaprin 
Triatex 
Triavil 
triaziquone (INN)
triazolam (INN)
tribendilol (INN)
tribenoside (INN)
tribromsalan (INN)
tribuzone (INN)

tric
Trichlorex 
Trichlormas 
trichlormethiazide (INN)
trichlormethine (INN)
triciribine (INN)
triclabendazole (INN)
triclacetamol (INN)
triclazate (INN)
triclobisonium chloride (INN)
triclocarban (INN)
triclodazol (INN)
triclofenol piperazine (INN)
triclofos (INN)
triclofylline (INN)
triclonide (INN)
Triclos 
triclosan (INN)
Tricor 
Tricosal
tricosactide (INN)
tricyclamol chloride (INN)

trid-trik
tridecatide (USAN)
Triderm 
Tridesilon 
tridihexethyl iodide (INN)
Tridil 
Tridione 
trientine (INN)
trifenagrel (INN)
trifezolac (INN)
triflocin (INN)
triflubazam (INN)
triflumidate (INN)
trifluomeprazine (INN)
trifluoperazine (INN)
trifluperidol (INN)
triflupromazine (INN)
trifluridine (INN)
triflusal (INN)
trifocon A (INN)
trigevolol (INN)
trihexyphenidyl (INN)
TriHIBit
Trikacide

tril
Trilafon 
Trileptal 
triletide (INN)
Trilisate
Trilitron 
trilostane (INN)
Trilyte

trim-trin
Trimazide
trimazosin (INN)
trimebutine (INN)
trimecaine (INN)
trimedoxime bromide (INN)
trimegestone (INN)
trimeperidine (INN)
trimeprazine tartrate 
trimetamide (INN)
trimetaphan camsilate (INN)
trimetazidine (INN)
Trimeth-Sulfa 
trimethadione (INN)
trimethidinium methosulfate (INN)
trimethobenzamide (INN)
trimethoprim (INN)
trimetozine (INN)
trimetrexate (INN)
trimexiline (INN)
trimipramine (INN)
trimoprostil (INN)
Trimox 
trimoxamine (INN)
Trimpex 
Trinalin
Trinasal
TriNessa

trio-triz
Triostat 
trioxifene (INN)
trioxysalen (INN)
tripalmitin (INN)
tripamide (INN)
triparanol (INN)
Tripedia
Tripelennamine 
tripelennamine (INN)
Triphasil 
Triphed 
triprolidine (INN)
triptorelin (INN)
Triquilar
Trisenox 
Trisenox (Cell Therapeutic) 
Trisoralen 
Trisudex
Tritec 
tritiozine (INN)
tritoqualine (INN)
Trivagizole 3 
Trivora 
trixolane (INN)
Trizivir 
trizoxime (INN)